AD-1211 is an opioid analgesic drug invented in the 1970s by Dainippon Pharmaceutical Co. It is chemically a 1-substituted-4-prenyl-piperazine derivative, which is structurally unrelated to most other opioid drugs. The (S)-enantiomers in this series are more active as opioid agonists, but the less active (R)-enantiomer of this compound, AD-1211, is a mixed agonist–antagonist at opioid receptors with a similar pharmacological profile to pentazocine, and has atypical opioid effects with little development of tolerance or dependence seen after extended administration in animal studies.

See also
 Diphenidine
 Diphenpipenol
 Ephenidine
 Fluorolintane
 Lanicemine
 Lefetamine
 Methoxphenidine (MXP)
 MT-45
 Remacemide
 AH-7921

References 

Synthetic opioids
Mu-opioid receptor agonists
Diphenylethylpiperazines
Designer drugs